Olav Hagen (November 28, 1921 – August 21, 2013) was a Norwegian cross country skier who competed during the 1940s. He won a bronze in the 4 × 10 km relay at the 1948 Winter Olympics in St. Moritz.

Cross-country skiing results

Olympic Games

External links
Sports Illustrated profile for Hagen
Olav Hagen's profile at Sports Reference.com

1921 births
2013 deaths
Norwegian male cross-country skiers
Olympic cross-country skiers of Norway
Olympic bronze medalists for Norway
Cross-country skiers at the 1948 Winter Olympics
Olympic medalists in cross-country skiing
Medalists at the 1948 Winter Olympics